Henanzhai Town is a town located in the Miyun District of Beijing, China. Situated at the northwest of Ligu Mountain, the town shares border with Gulou Subdistrict and Mujiayu Town in the north, Jugezhuang and Dongshaoqu Towns in the east, Mulin Town in the south, as well as Beifang and Shilipu Towns in the west. In the year 2020, the census counted 24,155 residents for this town.

The town got its name Henanzhai for its location south of Chao River.

History

Administrative divisions 
In 2021, Henanzhai Town was made up of 31 subdivisions, where 3 were communities and 28 were villages. They are listed as follows:

Transportation 
Beijing-Chengde Expressway and Miyun-Shunyi Highway passes through the town. Miyun railway station on Beijing–Shenyang high-speed railway is located in Henanzhai Town.

Gallery

See also 
 List of township-level divisions of Beijing

References

Miyun District
Towns in Beijing